The inaugural Arctic Ocean Conference was held in Ilulissat (Greenland) on 27-29 May 2008. Canada, Denmark, Norway, Russia and the United States discussed key issues relating to the Arctic Ocean. The meeting was significant because of its plans for environmental regulation, maritime security, mineral exploration, polar oil oversight, and transportation. Before the conclusion of the conference, the attendees announced the Ilulissat Declaration.

The conference was the first ever held at the ministerial level that included the five regional powers, the Arctic five. It came at the invitation of Per Stig Møller, Denmark's Foreign Minister, and Hans Enoksen, Greenlands Premier in 2007 after several territorial disputes in the Arctic. States Møller, "We must continue to fulfill our obligations in the Arctic area until the UN decides who will have the right to the sea and the resources in the region. We must agree on the rules and what to do if climate changes make more shipping possible." "We need to send a common political signal to both our own populations and the rest of the world that the five coastal states will address the opportunities and challenges in a responsible manner."

Ilulissat's melting glacier was an appropriate backdrop for the landmark conference.
The key ministry level attendees were:
 Canada: Gary Lunn, Minister for Nature Resources of Canada
 Denmark: Per Stig Møller, Minister for Foreign Affairs of Denmark; Hans Enoksen, Premier of Greenland
 Norway: Jonas Gahr Støre, Minister for Foreign Affairs of Norway
 Russia: Sergey Lavrov, Minister for Foreign Affairs of Russia
 United States: John D. Negroponte, Deputy Secretary of State

Controversy
The inclusion of some members of the Arctic Council while excluding others (indigenous peoples, Finland, Iceland, and Sweden) from the conference caused controversy. 

Defending Denmark's decision to exclude certain council members, Thomas Winkler, head of Denmark's International Law Department stated, "This meeting in Ilulissat is not a competition to the Arctic Council. The issues that we're going to discuss will be issues that is  the responsibility of the five coastal states of the Arctic Ocean."

The reaction by Aqqaluk Lynge, a Greenlandic politician and former president of the Inuit Circumpolar Conference, was concerned that indigenous peoples of the Arctic are being "marginalized".  "Inuit have their own definition of sovereignty."

See also

Arctic Council
Arctic Cooperation and Politics

Notes

References

External links
 Photo
 Enoksen's speech opening the conference
 Støre' speech at the conference

Climate change conferences
Foreign relations of Canada
Foreign relations of Denmark
Foreign relations of Greenland
Foreign relations of Norway
Foreign relations of the United States
Multilateral relations of Russia
Government of the Arctic
2008 in the environment
2008 in Greenland
21st-century diplomatic conferences
Diplomatic conferences in Greenland
2008 in international relations
Ilulissat
Denmark–United States relations
Greenland–United States relations
Denmark–Russia relations
Greenland–Russia relations
Canada–United States relations
Canada–Russia relations
Russia–United States relations
Norway–United States relations
Norway–Russia relations